Glenn S. Wakai (born May 14, 1967) is an American politician and a Democratic member of the Hawaii Senate since January 2011 representing District 15. Wakai consecutively served in the Hawaii State Legislature where he served from 2003 until 2011 in the Hawaii House of Representatives District 31 seat.

Childhood 

Glenn Wakai was given up by his teenage birth mother for adoption 47 years ago. Wakai was adopted by a Japanese-American couple in Hawaii when he was about 18 months old. While he later learned that he had been adopted, he never sought to find his birth mother out of consideration for his adoptive parents. Two years ago, when his adopted mother died of illness, Wakai's father gave him a passport. It was made out to Mitsuru Shimabukuro and had a photo of Wakai as an infant. When his father died, Wakai decided to seek out his birth mother. He was helped by his wife, Miki, who is originally from Japan. That was one of the important factors that got the wheels turning for last year's reunion. Not only was his wife a Japanese who could help locate the organization in Japan that handled the adoption, but his birth mother had also married an American, which meant there would be no language barrier when they met. Wakai's birth mother, Yoko Boughton, and her American husband were living in Okinawa, but flew to Hawaii for the special reunion last year. Yoko had gone to Tokyo to become a beautician when she gave birth when she was 16. She initially planned to raise the child herself, but her relatives strongly opposed the decision. Bitterly disappointed, she returned to Okinawa without the baby. She gave birth to a boy she named "Mitsuru," with the hope that he would have a "fulfilling" life as his name means.

Education
Wakai earned his BAs in broadcast journalism and sociology from the University of Southern California.

Elections
 2012 Wakai was unopposed for both the August 11, 2012 Democratic Primary, winning with 5,478 votes, and the November 6, 2012 General election.
 2002 When Democratic Representative Nathan Suzuki retired and left the House District 31 seat open, Wakai won the September 21, 2002 Democratic Primary with 1,975 votes (49.8%), and won the November 5, 2002 General election with 4,393 votes (58.2%) against Republican nominee Brad Sakamoto. who had been redistricted from District 6.
 2004 Wakai was unopposed for the September 18, 2004 Democratic Primary, winning with 3,056 votes, and won the November 2, 2004 General election with 4,841 votes (59.7%) against Republican nominee Kaipo Duncan.
 2006 Wakai was unopposed for the September 26, 2006 Democratic Primary, winning with 3,986 votes, and won the November 7, 2006 General election with 5,024 votes (76.7%) against Yvonne Perry.
 2008 Wakai was unopposed for both the September 20, 2008 Democratic Primary, winning with 3,141 votes, and the November 4, 2008 General election.
 2010 When Democratic Senator Norman Sakamoto ran for Lieutenant Governor of Hawaii and left the Senate District 15 seat open, Wakai was unopposed for the September 18, 2010 Democratic Primary, winning with 5,848 votes, and won the November 2, 2010 General election with 7,753 votes (62.4%) against Republican nominee Ben Pascua.

Social Activities
Glenn Wakai is President of non government organization Reach Out Pacific.

State microbe legislation
In 2014, Wakai proposed SB3124 which attempted to establish Aliivibrio fischeri as the state microbe of Hawaii.  This was opposing state representative James Tokioka's bill from the previous year, HB 293 HD1, to establish Flavobacterium akiainvivens as the state microbe.  Neither one succeeded.  In 2017, legislation similar to the original 2013 F. akiainvivens bill was submitted in the Hawaii House of Representatives by Isaac Choy and in the Hawaii Senate by Brian Taniguchi.

References

External links
 Official page at the Hawaii State Legislature
 Campaign site
 

Place of birth missing (living people)
1967 births
Living people
American adoptees
American people of Japanese descent
American politicians of Japanese descent
Japanese adoptees
Japanese emigrants to the United States
Democratic Party Hawaii state senators
Democratic Party members of the Hawaii House of Representatives
People from Hawaii (island)
USC Annenberg School for Communication and Journalism alumni
21st-century American politicians
Hawaii politicians of Japanese descent